Clastopteridae is a family of spittlebugs in the order Hemiptera. There are at least 10 genera and 100 described species in Clastopteridae.

Genera
These 10 genera belong to the family Clastopteridae:
 Allox Hamilton, 2014
 Clastoptera Germar, 1839
 Hemizygon Hamilton, 2014
 Iba Schmidt, 1920
 Parahindoloides Lallemand, 1951
 Paropia Germar, 1833
 Pseudoclastoptera Hamilton, 2014
 Taphrotylus Hamilton, 2015
 Zygon Hamilton, 2014
 † Prisciba Poinar, 2014

References

Further reading

External links

 

 
Auchenorrhyncha families
Cercopoidea